Münsterbrücke is a pedestrian and road bridge over the Limmat in the city of Zürich, Switzerland. It is listed in the Swiss inventory of cultural property of national and regional significance. It is indirectly named after two Münster (minsters), the Fraumünster and Grossmünster.

Geography 
Münsterbrücke crosses the Limmat, connecting Münsterhof and Limmatquai at the historical core of the medieval town of Zürich. It is the second bridge over the Limmat, below the Quaibrücke and above the Rathausbrücke.

Transportation 
The Zürich tram lines 2, 4 and 15 run past it on the Limmatquai. The ZSG Zürichsee-Schifffahrtsgesellschaft and its Limmat tour boats pass under it. Individual transportation is limited to road transport use between upper Limmatquai (Bellevueplatz), upstream of the Limmat, and Münsterhof, since the area is part of the pedestrian zone of Zürich.

Architecture 
In 1835, the chief engineer of the merchant society of the city of Zürich, Alois Negrelli, initiated the construction of the bridge in collaboration with the master-builders Conrad Stadler and Johann Jakob Locher-Oeri, who engineered the sophisticated wooden scaffold. The foundation was filled with concrete, and the spaces between the piles were reinforced with rubblestones. Above that, cofferdams and caissons were erected and reinforced by sandstone plates that lay on cement mortar. The pillars and cornices and the stones of the traffic lane are made of St. Gotthard granite. The cast-iron railings were produced in the Grand Duchy of Baden.

The present bridge has two lanes and sidewalks on both sides, but it is commonly used as a pedestrian and bicycle bridge as road transport is limited between Limmatquai and Münsterhof.

The Hans Waldmann (1435–1489) equestrian monument in front of the Fraumünster church was unveiled by the Kämbel guild on 6 April 1937 at the site of the former Fraumünster Kornhaus (granary), which was torn down in 1897, above the fifth arch of the bridge.

History 
The earliest bridge at the location was built in the Roman era, and in medieval Zürich a wooden bridge, called the Obere Brücke (upper bridge), connected the two banks of the Limmat. Between 1836 and 1838, the former wooden bridge was replaced by a stone bridge. Alois Negrelli engineered and supervised the construction of the bridge as it is still present today; it was inaugurated in August 1838. The bridge congested the traffic on the Limmat, so a land connection in the then "modern" Zürich was urgently needed by replacing the narrow medieval Reichsstrasse towards the present Rathausbrücke crossing. Thus, sections of the present Limmatquai on the eastern shore of the Limmat were built simultaneously.

Starting in 1861, the Fraumünster granary temporarily housed in one of its numerous empty rooms the Betraum of the Jewish citizens of Zürich until the Synagoge Zürich Löwenstrasse was built in 1881. Until May 1901 and between 1910 and 1924 there was even a tramway crossing the bridge towards Paradeplatz. The original construction has been repaired several times, most recently in the late 1990s.

Cultural heritage of national importance 
Münsterbrücke is listed in the Swiss inventory of cultural property of national and regional significance as a Class A object of national importance.

References

External links

Bridges in Zürich
Altstadt (Zürich)
Bridges completed in 1836
Bridges over the Limmat
Cultural property of national significance in the canton of Zürich
Road bridges in Switzerland
Pedestrian bridges in Switzerland
19th-century architecture in Switzerland